Saïd Tango (born 24 March 1971) is a Moroccan wrestler. He competed in the men's Greco-Roman 52 kg at the 1992 Summer Olympics.

References

1971 births
Living people
Moroccan male sport wrestlers
Olympic wrestlers of Morocco
Wrestlers at the 1992 Summer Olympics
Place of birth missing (living people)